Small Corners is a 1978 album of Contemporary Christian music by British singer Cliff Richard. It is his twentieth studio album and third gospel album. It was recorded in Abbey Road Studios in January 1977.

"Yes He Lives" was released in the UK as the lead single from the album, but did not chart. In France, "Why Should the Devil Have All the Good Music" was released as a single in April 1978, however it did not chart either. A significant portion  of the album consists of songs by American writers, including Larry Norman, Annie Herring, Kris Kristofferson and Randy Stonehill.

Critical response
AllMusic found that due to its "spontaneous air" it was more fun and less "pious" than his other religious recordings.  On its reissue, Mojo magazine gave it 3/5.

Track listing

Personnel
According to the album's liner notes.
Cliff Richard - lead vocals
Terry Britten, Bryn Haworth – guitar
Alan Tarney – bass guitar
Graham Todd – keyboards
Brian Bennett – drums and percussion
Tony Rivers, John Perry, Stuart Calver, Cliff Richard – vocal group
Nick Ingman – string arrangement

Technical personnel
Cliff Richard – producer
Tony Clark – engineer
Hayden Bendall, John Barret, Mike Jarrett, Allan Rouse – assistant engineers
Chris Blair, Nick Webb – mastering
Gered Mankowitz – photography

References

1978 albums
Cliff Richard albums
EMI Records albums
Christian rock albums by English artists
Contemporary Christian music albums by English artists